Each "article" in this category is a collection of entries about several stamp issuers, presented in alphabetical order. The entries are formulated on the micro model and so provide summary information about all known issuers.  

See the :Category:Compendium of postage stamp issuers page for details of the project.

Yanoan 

Refer 	French Indian Settlements

Yemen 

Main Article Postage stamps and postal history of Yemen

Includes 	Southern Yemen;
		Yemen Arab Republic;
		Yemen (Mutawakelite Kingdom);
		Yemen PDR;
		Yemen Republic

See also 	Aden Protectorate States

Yemen Arab Republic 

Dates 	1963 – 1990
Capital  	San‘a’
Currency  	(1963) 40 bogaches = 1 imadi
		(1964) 40 bogaches = 1 rial
		(1975) 100 fils = 1 riyal

Refer 	Yemen

Yemen (Mutawakelite Kingdom) 

Dates 	1926 – 1970
Capital  	San‘a’
Currency  	(1963) 40 bogaches = 1 imadi
		(1964) 40 bogaches = 1 rial

Refer 	Yemen

Yemen (People's Democratic Republic) 

Dates 	1971 – 1990
Capital  	Aden
Currency  	1000 fils = 1 dinar

Refer 	Yemen

Yemen Republic 

Dates 	1990 –
Capital  	San‘a’
Currency  	100 fils = 1 rial (north)
		1000 fils = 1 dinar (south)

Refer 	Yemen

Yokohama 

Refer 	Japan (French Post Offices)

Yugoslavia 

Dates 	1944 – 1992
Capital 	Belgrade
Currency 	100 paras = 1 dinar

Main Article  Postage stamps and postal history of Yugoslavia

Includes 	Srba Hrvata Slovena;
		Yugoslavia (Kingdom);
		Yugoslavia (Democratic Federation);
		Yugoslav Government in Exile

See also 	Bosnia & Herzegovina;
		Croatia;
		Macedonia;
		Montenegro;
		Serbia;
		Slovenia

Yugoslavia (Kingdom) 

Dates 	1929 – 1941
Capital 	Belgrade
Currency 	100 paras = 1 dinar

Refer 	Yugoslavia

Yugoslavia (Democratic Federation) 

Dates 	1944 – 1945
Capital 	Belgrade
Currency 	100 paras = 1 dinar

Refer 	Yugoslavia

Yugoslav Government in Exile 

Dates 	1943 – 1945
Currency 	100 paras = 1 dinar

Refer 	Yugoslavia

Yugoslav Military Government in Trieste 

Refer 	Trieste

Yugoslav Military Government in Venezia Giulia 

Refer 	Venezia Giulia & Istria (Yugoslav Military Government)

Yugoslav Occupation Issues 

Refer 	Fiume;
		Trieste;
		Venezia Giulia & Istria

Yunnan 

Dates 	1926 – 1933
Capital 	Mengtse
Currency 	100 cents = 1 dollar

Refer 	Chinese Provinces

Yunnanfu (Indochinese Post Office) 

Dates 	1903 – 1922
Currency 	100 cents = 1 dollar

Refer 	China (Indochinese Post Offices)

Yunnansen 

Refer 	Yunnanfu (Indochinese Post Office)

References

Bibliography
 Stanley Gibbons Ltd, Europe and Colonies 1970, Stanley Gibbons Ltd, 1969
 Stanley Gibbons Ltd, various catalogues
 Stuart Rossiter & John Flower, The Stamp Atlas, W H Smith, 1989
 XLCR Stamp Finder and Collector's Dictionary, Thomas Cliffe Ltd, c.1960

External links
 AskPhil – Glossary of Stamp Collecting Terms
 Encyclopaedia of Postal History

Yan